A shovel is a tool used for digging, lifting, and moving bulk materials, such as soil, coal, gravel, snow, sand, or ore.

Most shovels are hand tools consisting of a broad blade fixed to a medium-length handle. Shovel blades are usually made of sheet steel or hard plastics and are very strong. Shovel handles are usually made of wood (especially specific varieties such as ash or maple) or glass-reinforced plastic (fiberglass).

Hand shovel blades made of sheet steel usually have a folded seam or hem at the back to make a socket for the handle. This fold also commonly provides extra rigidity to the blade. The handles are usually riveted in place. A T-piece is commonly fitted to the end of the handle to aid grip and control where the shovel is designed for moving soil and heavy materials. These designs can all be easily mass-produced.

The term shovel also applies to larger excavating machines called power shovels, which serve the same purpose—digging, lifting, and moving material. Although such modern power shovels as front-end loaders and excavators (including tractors that feature a loading bucket on one end and a backhoe for digging and placing material on the other) descend from steam shovels and perform similar work they are not classified as shovels.

Hand shovels have been adapted for many different tasks and environments. They can be optimized for a single task or designed as cross-over or compromise multitaskers. They are very useful in agriculture.

History

In the Neolithic age and earlier, a large animal's scapula (shoulder blade) was often used as a crude shovel or spade. It is via this connection between shoulder blades and digging blades that the words spatula and spade both have etymologic connection with scapulas.

The later invention of purpose-built shovels was a ground-breaking development.  Manual shoveling, often in combination with picking, was the chief means of excavation in construction until mechanization via steam shovels and later hydraulic equipment (excavators such as backhoes and loaders) gradually replaced most manual shoveling. The same is also true of the history of mining and quarrying and of bulk materials handling in industries such as steelmaking and stevedoring. Railroad cars and cargo holds containing ore, coal, gravel, sand, or grains were often loaded and unloaded this way. These industries did not always rely exclusively on such work, but such work was a ubiquitous part of them. Until the 1950s, manual shoveling employed large numbers of workers. Groups of workers called 'labor gangs' were assigned to whatever digging or bulk materials handling was needed in any given week, and dozens or hundreds of workers with hand shovels would do the kind of rapid excavating or materials handling that today is usually accomplished with powered excavators and loaders operated by a few skilled operators. Thus the cost of labor, even when each individual worker was poorly paid, was a tremendous expense of operations. Productivity of the business was tied mostly to labor productivity. It still often is even today; but in the past it was even more so. In industrial and commercial materials handling, hand shoveling was later replaced not only with loaders and backhoes.

Given the central importance and cost of manual labour in industry in the late 19th and early 20th centuries, the "science of shoveling" was something of great interest to developers of scientific management such as Frederick Winslow Taylor. Taylor, with his focus on time and motion study, took an interest in differentiating the many motions of manual labor to a far greater degree than others tended to. Managers might not care to analyze it (possibly motivated by the assumption that manual labor is intellectually simple work), and workers might not care to analyze it in any way that encouraged management to take away the prerogative in craft work for the craftsman to decide the details of his methods. Taylor realized that failing to analyze shoveling practice represented a missed opportunity to discover or synthesize best practices for shoveling, which could achieve highest productivity (value for dollar spent). It was Taylor and colleagues in the 1890s through 1910s that greatly expanded the existing idea of varied shovel designs with different-sized scoops, one for each material, based on the material's density. Under scientific management, it was no longer acceptable to use the same shovel for shoveling brown coal one day and gravel the next. Taylor advocated the higher capital cost of maintaining two shovels as more than paying for itself through the increase in worker productivity that it would lead to, which would mean less money being spent on wages for each unit of shoveling work accomplished.

During the Second Industrial Revolution around 1900, heavy equipment such as excavators became available.

Types

See also
 Dustpan, a form of shovel

Citations

General bibliography

External links 
 

 
Gardening tools